Adam Adami Martins (born 24 June 1992), also known as Adam Adami, is a Brazilian professional footballer who plays as a midfielder for Campionato Sammarinese di Calcio club Tre Fiori.

Club career
Adami joined the Flamengo futsal youth system at age seven and later joined America, Audax and Volta Redonda. He then relocated to Belgium to play with BX Brussels, and then went to San Marino to make his competitive debut with Pennarossa. In 2021, Adami left Pennarossa to play for Tre Fiori.

Personal life
Adami is of Italian descent, with his maternal grandparents hailing from Mantua. He received his Italian passport in 2018.

Career statistics

Club

Honours
Coppa Titano: 2021–22
Super Coppa Sammarinese: 2022

References

External links
 
 Adam Adami Martins at Eurosport
 FmDataba profile

1992 births
Living people
Brazilian people of Italian descent
Citizens of Italy through descent
Footballers from Rio de Janeiro (city)
Brazilian footballers
Association football midfielders
S.P. Tre Fiori players
S.S. Pennarossa players
Campionato Sammarinese di Calcio players
Brazilian expatriate footballers
Brazilian expatriate sportspeople in San Marino
Expatriate footballers in San Marino